Jason Bourne is the title character and the protagonist in a series of novels and subsequent film adaptations. The character was created by novelist Robert Ludlum. He first appeared in the novel The Bourne Identity (1980), which was adapted for television in 1988. The novel was adapted into a feature film of the same name in 2002 and starred Matt Damon in the lead role.

The character originally featured in three novels by Ludlum, released between 1980 and 1990, followed by eleven novels written by Eric Van Lustbader between 2004 and 2019, and three novels by Brian Freeman since 2020.  Along with the first feature film, Jason Bourne also appears in three sequel films The Bourne Supremacy (2004),  The Bourne Ultimatum (2007), and Jason Bourne (2016), with Damon again in the lead role. Jeremy Renner stars in the fourth film of the franchise, The Bourne Legacy, released in August 2012. Damon stated in interviews that he would not do another Bourne film without Paul Greengrass, who had directed the second and third installments. Greengrass agreed to direct Damon in the fifth installment in the franchise. Greengrass jointly wrote the screenplay with editor Christopher Rouse.

Literary backstory 
Jason Bourne is but one of many aliases used by David Webb, a career Foreign Service Officer, and a specialist in Far Eastern affairs. Before the events in The Bourne Identity, Webb had a Thai wife named Dao and two children named Joshua and Alyssa in Phnom Penh.  Webb's wife and children were killed during the Vietnam War when a fighter plane strayed into Cambodia, dropped two bombs, and strafed a spot near the Mekong River. However, unknown to Webb, Joshua survived. Due to Cambodia's neutrality in the war, every nation disclaimed the plane, and, therefore, no one took responsibility for the incident. Enraged by both the injustice and randomness of his loss, Webb went to Saigon and, under the careful guidance of friend and CIA officer Alexander Conklin, ended up training for an elite top secret Special Forces unit called "Medusa". Within that select organization Webb was known only by his code name, "Delta One".

Medusa 
An assassination team or death squad, Medusa, was created to infiltrate Northern Vietnam and assassinate members of the Viet Cong and its collaborators. Its members were criminals; its leader, a man called Delta, ran Medusa with an iron fist. He became well known for his ruthlessness, his disregard for orders, and his disturbing success rate on missions, resulting in the kidnapping of Webb's brother, U.S. Army Lieutenant Gordon Webb, during his tour of duty in Saigon.

During the mission to save Gordon Webb, an original "Medusa" team member named Jason Charles Bourne was discovered to be a double agent who alerted a large number of North Vietnamese soldiers to their whereabouts. When Delta found Bourne after killing his way through the North Vietnamese, he simply killed Bourne in the jungles of Tam Quan. Bourne's execution was never exposed due to the top secret status of Medusa.

Operation Treadstone 
Years later, a black ops arm of the CIA, called "Treadstone Seventy-One" after a building on New York's Seventy-First Street, was formed to eliminate the notorious Carlos the Jackal. Webb was called up by David Abbott, nicknamed "The Monk", to be its principal agent. At this point, Webb (Delta) takes the identity of Jason Bourne, due to the actual Bourne's status as MIA in the war, as well as the fact that Bourne was in reality a brutal killer with a long criminal record. The point was to turn "Jason Bourne" into an elite, ruthlessly efficient assassin who would be feared by terrorists and criminals worldwide. The assassin's alias was "Cain". The reasoning for creating such a myth was to create competition for the well-known assassin named "Carlos", or "Carlos the Jackal" (real name Ilich Ramírez Sánchez) who at that time was considered the world's best and most famous assassin. By creating this myth, Cain was to drive the reclusive Carlos out into the open "long enough to put a bullet in his head".

Film backstory 
In the film series, Jason Bourne is revealed to have been born David Webb on September 13, 1970 (or June 4, 1978 in Jason Bourne) in Nixa, Missouri (although in Ultimatum, he is given a false date of April 15, 1971, as a coded reference to a specific site). In flashbacks, he joins the United States Army and is eventually selected for CIA Treadstone program in 1997. His father, Richard Webb, a senior CIA analyst, is responsible for creating the Treadstone, a black ops project intended to train and deploy elite assassins. The CIA murders his father with a false flag car bomb in Beirut in a bid to recruit Webb.

The ploy is shown to have worked; Webb approaches the CIA and is brought into the program by Neil Daniels, a supervisor in the Treadstone program, while being monitored by Dr. Albert Hirsch, who supervises the medical assessment of Treadstone agents. He is brought into a secret recruitment center in New York City, where Hirsch orders him tortured for days — via waterboarding and sleep deprivation — to break his spirit and allow him to be molded into an assassin. He is officially accepted when he murders an unidentified man (implied to be the real Jason Bourne) without question. After that, he is given a new identity as Jason Bourne, and his true identity becomes a classified secret.

After heavy training, in which he learns several languages and masters a wide array of martial arts skills, Bourne is placed in the Treadstone program, whose missions are run by Conklin. His first assignment, an unofficial one, is revealed to have happened in Berlin, Germany: the assassination of Vladimir Neski, a Russian politician who was intending to expose the theft of $20 million in secret funds stolen from the CIA by Treadstone's Director, Ward Abbott, and a Russian oligarch, Yuri Gretkov. Under Conklin's orders, Bourne murders Neski and his wife and makes it look like a murder-suicide.

Bourne works in the program as its top agent for three years, stationed in Paris, France, maintaining a secluded life while performing assassinations, mostly around Europe. His official handler is logistics agent Nicky Parsons, also stationed in Paris, who is implied to have feelings for Bourne that she keeps hidden from Treadstone employers.

The turning point in his life comes after an order to murder Nykwana Wombosi, an exiled African warlord who was blackmailing the CIA into reinstating him as head of state, lest he expose several CIA secrets. Using an alias, John Michael Kane, Bourne gathers information on Wombosi. He infiltrates the warlord's yacht and hides inside it for five days, surfacing on a cold night in the middle of the Mediterranean Sea, intending to arrange the murder to look like he was killed by a crew member to avoid suspicion. However, Wombosi is surrounded by his children, and Bourne is unable to bring himself to kill him. He tries to abandon the mission by leaving the boat, but an unknown shooter shoots him twice in the back, sending him off the yacht into the sea and triggering amnesia, causing Webb / Bourne to forget his identity.

Appearances

Novels 
The series has included fifteen novels which have been written by two authors, Robert Ludlum and Eric Van Lustbader. Ludlum's series include the first three books, dubbed the Bourne trilogy. After Ludlum's death in 2001, Lustbader took over the character in his own series of novels, which span eleven books as of 2020. A twelfth novel, The Bourne Nemesis, was scheduled to be released in 2019, but as of July 2020 is no longer expected to be published.

Written by Robert Ludlum

The Bourne Identity (1980) 

A man is found floating unconscious in the Mediterranean Sea near Marseille by Italian fishermen with two gunshot wounds in his back. He wakes and discovers he has extreme memory loss. Film negative embedded in his hip leads him to a bank in Zurich where he learns he is known by the name Jason Bourne. As he tries to reclaim his memory, Bourne attracts the attention of hostile people for reasons unknown to him. At a hotel, while cornered, Bourne takes a young woman, Marie St. Jacques, hostage to escape. Marie is an employee of the Government of Canada. Bourne and Marie discover that "Jason Bourne" is the cover identity of a contract assassin, and that both the CIA and another contract killer known as Carlos the Jackal have an interest in him. Marie is convinced that this man she has come to know cannot be the ruthless killer that all their discoveries seem to imply. She compels Bourne to continue searching for his true identity and, in the end, he finds the truth. Through this time, Bourne has the phrase "Cain is for Charlie, and Delta is for Cain" continually flash through his mind, propelling him in the direction of his mission.

The Bourne Supremacy (1986) 

Having recovered his memory and retired from the CIA, David Webb now teaches Asian Studies at a university in Maine and lives with Marie. She is taken captive seemingly by a powerful Chinese drug lord, but in reality, by the United States government using the fictitious drug lord as cover. The scheme is an attempt to turn Webb back into his former self, the mythical Jason Bourne, to go after a Bourne impostor in China. The phony Bourne has been credited with a Far East political assassination that could, in a worst-case scenario, cause a Chinese civil war over the ownership of Hong Kong.

The Bourne Ultimatum (1990) 

As an aging Carlos the Jackal's infamy fades, he decides that he will do two things before he dies: kill Jason Bourne and destroy the KGB facility of Novgorod, where the Jackal was trained and later turned away. Webb's family is forced to hide in the Caribbean while Webb himself works with Conklin to hunt down and kill the Jackal. Webb poses as an important member of Medusa, now a nearly omnipotent economic force that controls the commander of NATO, leading figures in the Defense Department, and large NYSE firms. The plan is to use Medusa's resources to contact the Jackal. Webb just misses the Jackal several times before Webb fakes his own death to draw him out. Following this, the Jackal turns to his second goal. Webb tracks the Jackal down with the help of Conklin and a KGB agent as the Jackal begins destroying the KGB compound. In a final confrontation, the Jackal is led into a dam lock in which he drowns, and Webb returns to his family.

Written by Eric Van Lustbader

The Bourne Legacy (2004) 

With the climactic events of The Bourne Ultimatum behind him, Jason Bourne is able to once again become David Webb, now professor of linguistics at Georgetown University. However, this serenity does not last for long. When a silenced gunshot narrowly misses Webb's head, the Bourne persona reawakens in him. His first objective is to reach Conklin. However, unknown to Bourne, a Hungarian by the name of Stepan Spalko has now led him into a trap—one which he cannot escape as easily as his professional façade. And the man who nearly killed him in Georgetown continues his deadly, intensely personal pursuit.

The Bourne Betrayal (2007) 

Jason Bourne takes a mission to rescue his only friend in the CIA, Martin Lindros, who disappeared in Africa while tracking shipments of uranium. Once safely back in America, Lindros persuades Bourne to help track the money trail of terrorists buying the nuclear material in Odessa. But once there, Bourne is hampered by confusing flashbacks of unfamiliar places and events and he wonders if someone is brainwashing him in order to throw him off the trail, or worse, if the man he saved in Africa is really Martin Lindros. Now, Bourne must gather evidence while trying to stay one step ahead of the terrorists who won't let anyone stand in their way.

The Bourne Sanction (2008) 

Jason Bourne returns to Georgetown University, and the mild world of his alter ego, David Webb, hoping for normality. But, after so many adrenaline-soaked years of risking his life, Bourne finds himself chafing under the quiet life of a linguistics professor. Aware of his frustrations, his academic mentor, Professor Spector, asks for help investigating the murder of a former student. The young man died carrying information about a group's terrorist activities, including an immediate plan to attack the United States. The organization, the Black Legion, and its plot have also popped up on the radar of the Central Intelligence Agency, whose new director Veronica Hart is struggling to assert her authority. Sensing an opportunity to take control of the CIA by showing Hart's incompetence, National Security Agency operatives attempt to accomplish what the CIA never could do, hunt down and kill Jason Bourne. In Europe, Bourne's investigation into the Black Legion turns into one of the deadliest and most tangled operations of his double life—while an assassin is getting closer by the minute.

The Bourne Deception (2009) 

Bourne's nemesis, Arkadin, is still hot on his trail, and the two continue their struggle, reversing roles of hunter and hunted. When Bourne is ambushed and badly wounded, he fakes his death and goes into hiding. In safety, he takes on a new identity, and begins a mission to find out who tried to assassinate him. Jason begins to question who he really is, how much of him is tied up in the Bourne identity, and what he would become if that was suddenly taken away from him. Meanwhile, an American passenger airliner is shot down over Egypt by what seems to be an Iranian missile. A massive global investigative team is assembled to get at the truth of the situation before it can escalate into an international scandal. Bourne's search for the man who shot him intersects with the search for the people who brought down the airliner, leading Bourne into one of the most deadly and challenging situations he has ever encountered. With the threat of a new world war brewing, Bourne finds himself in a race against time to uncover the truth and find the person behind his assault, all the while being stalked by his unknown nemesis.

The Bourne Objective (2010) 

The Bourne Objective is the eighth novel in the Bourne series, and the fifth written by Eric Van Lustbader. The book was released in 2010, sequel to The Bourne Deception. 

The killing of an art dealer dredges up snatches of Jason Bourne's impaired memory, in particular the murder of a young woman who entrusted him with a strangely engraved ring. Now he's determined to find its owner and purpose. But Bourne never knows what terrible acts he'll discover he committed when he digs into the past. The trail will lead him to a vicious Russian mercenary, Leonid Arkadin, also a graduate of the Central Intelligence training program Treadstone. The covert course was shuttered by Congress for corruption, but not before it produced Bourne and Arkadin, giving them equal skills, equal force, and equal cunning. As Bourne's destiny circles closer to Arkadin's, it becomes clear that someone else has been watching and manipulating them.

The Bourne Dominion (2011) 

Jason Bourne is searching for an elusive cadre of terrorists planning to destroy America's most strategic natural resources—and needs the help of his longtime friend, General Boris Karpov. Karpov, the newly appointed head of Russia's most feared spy agency, FSB-2, is one of the most determined, honorable, and justice-hungry men that Bourne knows. But Karpov has made a deal with the devil. In order to remain the head of FSB-2, he must hunt down and kill Bourne. Now, these two trusted friends are on a deadly collision course. From the Colombian highlands to Munich, Cádiz, and Damascus, the clock is counting down to a disaster that will cripple America's economic and military future. Only Bourne and Karpov have a chance to avert the catastrophe—but if they destroy each other first, that chance will be gone forever.

The Bourne Imperative (2012) 

The tenth book in the series was published on June 5, 2012. The man Jason Bourne fished out of the freezing sea is near death, half-drowned and bleeding profusely from a gunshot wound. He awakens with no memory of who he is or why he was shot, and Bourne is eerily reminded of his own amnesia. Then Bourne discovers that the Mossad agent named Rebeka is so determined to find this injured man that she has gone off the grid, cut her ties to her agency, and is now being stalked by Mossad's most feared killer. The answers to these mysteries may lie back in southeast Lebanon, in a secret encampment to which Bourne and Rebeka escaped following a firefight weeks ago. The complex trail links to the mission given to Treadstone directors Peter Marks and Soraya Moore: find the semi-mythic terrorist assassin known as Nicodemo. In the course of Bourne's desperate, deadly search for a secret that will alter the future of the entire world, he will experience both triumph and loss, and his life will never be the same. Now everything turns on the amnesiac. Bourne must learn his identity and purpose before both he and Rebeka are killed. From Stockholm to Washington, D.C., from Mexico City to Beijing, the web of lies and betrayals extends into a worldwide conspiracy of monumental proportions.

The Bourne Retribution (2013) 

The eleventh book in the series was published on December 3, 2013. Bourne's friend Eli Yadin, head of Mossad, learns that Ouyang Jidan, a senior member of China's Politburo, and a major Mexican drug lord may have been trafficking in more than drugs. Yadin needs Bourne to investigate. Bourne agrees, but only because he has a personal agenda: Ouyang Jidan is the man who ordered Rebeka—one of the very few people Bourne has ever truly cared about—murdered. Bourne is determined to avenge her death, but in the process he becomes enmeshed in a monstrous worldwide scheme involving the Chinese, Mexicans, and Russians. Bourne's desperate search for Ouyang takes him from Tel Aviv to Shanghai, Mexico City, and, ultimately, a village on China's coast where a clever trap has been laid for him. Bourne finds himself pursued on all sides and unsure whom he can trust.

The Bourne Ascendancy (2014) 

The twelfth book in the Bourne series was published on June 10, 2014. Bourne has been hired to impersonate a high-level government minister at a political summit meeting in Qatar, shielding the minister from any assassination attempts. Suddenly, armed gunmen storm the room, killing everyone but Bourne. Their target, however, isn't the minister Bourne impersonates....it is Bourne himself.

Kidnapped and transported to an underground bunker, Bourne finds himself face-to-face with an infamous terrorist named El Ghadan ("Tomorrow"). El Ghadan holds as his captive Soraya Moore, former co-director of Treadstone, and a close friend to Bourne, along with her two-year-old daughter.

Meanwhile, the President of the United States is in the midst of brokering a historic peace treaty between the Israelis and the Palestinians—an event that El Ghadan is desperate to prevent. He demands that Bourne carry out a special mission: kill the President. If Bourne refuses, Soraya and her daughter will die. Bourne must make a monstrous choice: save Soraya and her daughter, or save the President.

The Bourne Enigma (2016) 

The Bourne Enigma is the thirteenth novel in the Bourne series, published on June 21, 2016. On the eve of Russian general Boris Karpov's wedding, Jason Bourne receives an enigmatic message from his old friend and fellow spymaster. In Moscow, what should be a joyous occasion turns bloody and lethal. Now Bourne is the only one who can decipher Karpov's cryptogram. He discovers that Karpov has betrayed his sovereign to warn Bourne of a crippling disaster about to be visited on the world. Bourne has only four days to discover the nature of the disaster and stop it.

The trail Karpov has been following leads Bourne to Cairo and the doorstep of Ivan Borz, the elusive international arms dealer infamous for hiding behind a never-ending series of false identities, a man Bourne has been hunting ever since he abducted former Treadstone director Soraya Moore and her two-year-old daughter and brutally murdered Soraya's husband.

Bourne must travel to war-torn Syria and then Cyprus as he chases the astonishing truth. The clock is ticking, and Bourne has less than four days to solve Karpov's riddle—and hunt down Borz—if he hopes to prevent a cataclysmic international war.

The Bourne Initiative (2017) 

The Bourne Initiative is the fourteenth novel in the Bourne series, and was published in July 2017. Gen. Boris Karpov, head of the feared Russian FSB, is dead. But Karpov has reached out from the grave with an unstoppable cyber operation he conceived in the months before his murder, aimed at the heart of the United States—a way to steal the president's nuclear launch codes. Who has taken over the operation? Karpov trusted only one man: Jason Bourne. But can Bourne be working against his own country? Gen. Arthur MacQuerrie, chief of the Dreadnaught Section of NSA and Morgana Broussard, head of the mysterious Meme, LLC, are convinced of Bourne's treasonous act, and will do everything in their power to kill him.

Flushed from cover, hunted by the best assassins in the business, wounded and nearly killed, Bourne's only hope is to join forces with his bitterest enemy, a Somali magus named Keyre, whose terrorist forces Bourne once decimated. Now Keyre is more powerful than ever, with a burgeoning international network—a man who can help Bourne, but to what end? Lying in wait is the young woman Bourne saved from Keyre's torture, who now calls herself the Angelmaker. Both seductive and deadly, the Angelmaker loves Bourne, watches over him, but from whom does she take her orders? Is she ally or adversary?

These are questions Bourne must answer before he can unravel the mystery of Boris Karpov's last legacy, a weaponized code that may very well bring about the unthinkable: a violent end to America.

The Bourne Nemesis (2019) 

The Bourne Nemesis is the fifteenth novel in the Bourne series, and had been scheduled to be published in 2019, but missed its publication date and no future publication date was given.
Jason Bourne returns. He's fought against the NSA, Black off-site cyber operations, a Somali terrorist organisation and been accused of treason against the US. Now the Russians have planted a mole to uncover Bourne's secrets and launch cyber-warfare against the United States. 
Meanwhile, Bourne's former colleague, Soroya Moore, needs his help. Six highly skilled field agents have disappeared, the body parts of three found in a national park in Georgia. Facing death and destruction in the shadows of civilisation, Bourne will battle his deadliest nemesis yet.

Written by Brian Freeman

The Bourne Evolution (2020) 
Jason Bourne has gone rogue, leaving Treadstone behind and going on a new mission to infiltrate and expose an extremist group, called Medusa. And while more enemies begin to hunt down Bourne while he investigates, it's a race against time to discover who led him into this trap and what their next move is going to be.

The Bourne Treachery (2021)

The Bourne Sacrifice (2022)

Television 
In 1988, a two-part made-for-television movie of The Bourne Identity aired on ABC. It starred Richard Chamberlain as Jason Bourne and Jaclyn Smith as Marie St. Jacques.  The TV movie was largely faithful to Robert Ludlum's novel, both in plot as well as in the portrayal of the character of Jason Bourne.

A spin-off of the Universal-produced film franchise entitled Treadstone began airing in October 2019 on USA Network. It explores the origins of the Treadstone program and operatives other than Bourne. Producer Ben Smith, who worked on the recent two Bourne films, said the show will tie into the next film in the franchise.

Film 

The Jason Bourne novels were adapted into a series of films – The Bourne Identity (2002), The Bourne Supremacy (2004), The Bourne Ultimatum (2007), The Bourne Legacy (2012), and Jason Bourne (2016). The films retain the titles and some base elements but otherwise feature different plots independent of the novels. In these films, Bourne is portrayed by Matt Damon.

Bourne does not appear in The Bourne Legacy, with the exception of his picture being featured in the film as well as brief discussions of how he's caused problems to the organization he worked for. As  a result, the film focuses on the fallout in the intelligence community from Bourne's actions in Ultimatum. Legacy features Jeremy Renner as Aaron Cross, an operative in a different clandestine program evolved from Treadstone.

In 2019, Damon reprised his role as the fallen angel Loki from the View Askewniverse film Dogma (1999) in Jay and Silent Bob Reboot in a cameo appearance; in the film, Loki indicates that he was Jason Bourne, having lived Bourne's life and that of Damon's in the films' fictional universe.

Video games 
A video game titled Robert Ludlum's The Bourne Conspiracy was released in 2008 for the Xbox 360 and PlayStation 3.

The Ludlum estate obtained the rights to the video game franchise and sold it to Electronic Arts in 2009. EA planned to make several Bourne games. Their first game was to have been developed by Starbreeze Studios, but has since been shelved.

Radical Entertainment were reportedly developing a Bourne game titled Treadstone after a former animator of the now-defunct developer released a rough test reel, but it has since been canceled.

Franchise overview 
The Bourne franchise consists of several novels, movies, television series, a video game and a tourist attractions, all featuring one of the several versions of the Jason Bourne character.
 Robert Ludlum novels:
 The Bourne Identity (1980)
 The Bourne Supremacy (1986)
 The Bourne Ultimatum (1990)
 Eric Van Lustbader novels:
 The Bourne Legacy (2004)
 The Bourne Betrayal (2007)
 The Bourne Sanction  (2008)
 The Bourne Deception  (2009)
 The Bourne Objective  (2010)
 The Bourne Dominion (2011)
 The Bourne Imperative (2012)
 The Bourne Retribution (2013)
 The Bourne Ascendancy (2014)
 The Bourne Enigma (2016)
 The Bourne Initiative (2017)
The Bourne Nemesis (cancelled)
 Brian Freeman novels:
 The Bourne Evolution (2020)
 The Bourne Treachery (2021)
 The Bourne Sacrifice (2022)
 Films:
 The Bourne Identity (1988 TV film)
 The Bourne Identity (2002)
 The Bourne Supremacy (2004)
 The Bourne Ultimatum (2007)
 The Bourne Legacy (2012)
 Jason Bourne (2016)
 Television series:	
 Treadstone (2019)
 Video games:
 The Bourne Conspiracy (2008)
 Tourist attractions:
 The Bourne Stuntacular (2020)

References

 
Action film characters
Characters in American novels of the 20th century
Fictional assassins
Fictional characters from Missouri
Literary characters introduced in 1980
Book series introduced in 1980
Fictional characters with amnesia
Fictional Central Intelligence Agency personnel
Fictional United States Foreign Service personnel
Fictional United States Army Delta Force personnel
Fictional double agents
Fictional sleeper agents
Fictional eskrimadors
Fictional Jeet Kune Do practitioners

Fictional linguists
Fictional professors
Fictional schoolteachers
Fictional super soldiers
Fictional United States Marine Corps Force Reconnaissance personnel
Fictional Vietnam War veterans
Spy film characters
Thriller film characters
Universal Pictures characters
Fictional polyglots